Tafsir Meshkat is an exegesis on Qur'an by contemporary Shia Islam scholar Mohammad Ali Ansari in Persian. The author has emphasized on the moral aspect in this commentary and is mainly written for common people. The book makes use of old and new Persian poems, as well as history, sociology and other scientific observations. The author spends a fair amount of time in this commentary on the roots and meanings of the words used in the Qur'an.

Book specification 
So far there has been 3 volumes out of the total of 40, which according to the author will be published within 15 years. The first volume of this work consists of two parts. The first part discusses an introduction to exegesis and the second part starts with commentating on the first verse in Qur'an, "The Opening" (Al-Fatiha). The second volume covers verses 1 to 47 of the 2nd Qur'anic chapter. The third volume covers verses 48 to 104 of the 2nd Qur'anic chapter.

See also
Qur'an
Qur'anic exegesis (Tafsir)
List of tafsir works

References

Shia tafsir
Iranian books